"You've Been a Friend to Me" is a rock song by Bryan Adams. The single was released worldwide in December 2009. It is the theme song for the Disney film Old Dogs.

A video was made featuring Adams playing various members of his band with disguises, such as wigs, eyeglasses, and different clothing. Adams also directed the video. A new mix of the song was included on the deluxe version of his 2014 album, Tracks of My Years.

This song became a Top 20 Adult Contemporary hit in his native Canada, reaching #13.

Track listing

Chart positions

References 

Bryan Adams songs
2009 singles
Songs written by Bryan Adams
2009 songs
Universal Music Group singles
Polydor Records singles
Songs written by Gretchen Peters